Fires on the Plain (Japanese: 野火 Nobi) is a Yomiuri Prize-winning novel by Ooka Shohei, published in 1951. It describes the experiences of a soldier of the routed Imperial Japanese Army in the Philippines, as part of the Battle of Leyte and the Battle of Ormoc Bay, at the end of 1944, towards the final months of World War II.

Summary
The story is told through the eyes of a Private Tamura who, after being thrown out by his own company due to illness, chooses to desert the military altogether and wanders aimlessly through the Philippine jungle during the Allied campaign. Descending into delirium, Tamura is forced to confront nature, his childhood faith, hunger, his own mortality, and in the end, cannibalism.

Literary significance and criticism
The book received the Yomiuri Prize and, along with Tsukamaru made, is perhaps the best-known of Ooka's work among English readers.  An English language translation by Ivan Morris was completed in 1957. It was made into a film of the same name in 1959, directed by Kon Ichikawa and starring Eiji Funakoshi.  David C. Stahl has noted that Morris expunged sections where the narrator makes clear that he is manipulating the memoir, while Ichikawa focused on the helplessness of the individual in the face of war.  In both versions, the Tamura character is more passive and weak than in the original work.

Morris, writing in his introduction in the 1957 English version that he translated, praised the book as one of the most "powerful accounts of the obscenity of war that has ever been written".

Notes and references 

1951 novels
Anti-war novels
20th-century Japanese novels
Japanese novels adapted into films
Novels set in the Philippines
Novels set during World War II
Secker & Warburg books